The Ivory Coast national football team results and fixtures for 2010.

Record

Updated as of June 24, 2010

Goal scorers

Updated as of June 24, 2010

Schedule

References

 Côte d'Ivoire: Fixtures and Results

2010
2010 national football team results
National Football Team